Curt Rudolf Glover Engelhorn (25 May 1926 – 13 October 2016) was a German billionaire heir and businessman, the great-grandson of Friedrich Engelhorn, the founder of the chemical company BASF.

Education
Engelhorn graduated with a bachelor's degree in chemical engineering from the University of Texas at Austin.

Career
Engelhorn led the pharmaceutical companies Boehringer Mannheim and DePuy Inc. for more than three and a half decades. In 1997, he sold the two firms (in which together he had a 40% stake) to Hoffmann-La Roche for more than $10 billion.

In 2008, it was announced that Engelhorn would be donating 400,000 euros annually over 10 years to support American studies at the Heidelberg Center for American Studies.

Until 2012, Engelhorn owned Five Star Island, Bermuda a major share holding in a Bermuda registered German pharmaceutical multinational Corange Ltd.

Since late 2013, there have been ongoing investigations by the German authorities concerning suspected tax frauds between Engelhorn and his daughters, avoiding capital transfer taxes of up to 440 million euros (US$475 million). As of January 2016, the family's lawyers conceded capital transfer tax evasions in the amount of Euro 135 million (US$145 million) to the court.

Personal life
Engelhorn is the great-grandson of Friedrich Engelhorn, the founder of the German chemical company BASF. He was married with five children and lived in Gstaad, Switzerland, with other homes in Costa Brava, Spain and on the Côte d'Azur, France.

As of June 2015, according to Forbes, Engelhorn had a net worth of $6.2 billion. He died on 13 October 2016, aged 90.

Other
In 2012, it was discovered that an authentic 12th-century cloister had been used as a pool decoration in one of Engelhorn's Spanish estates, hidden from the public and the Spanish conservation authorities for more than half a century.

See also
List of billionaires

References

1926 births
2016 deaths
Swiss businesspeople
German billionaires
German expatriates in Switzerland
Engelhorn family
People from Gstaad
20th-century German businesspeople
21st-century German businesspeople
People named in the Paradise Papers